Edgars Zalāns  (born 3 September 1967) is a Latvian politician and architect. He was Minister of Regional Development and Local Governments of Latvia from 8 November 2007 to 17 March 2010.

Biography
Zalāns graduated from Riga Technical University in 1992, obtaining a diploma of architecture followed by a post-graduate certificate in Planning from the University of Queensland in 1994. From 1992 until 1994 he was a key architect in the Kuldīga district. For several years he worked as the district council and Kuldīga City Hall. During the period from 2001 until 2007 he was a member of the Kuldīga City Council. In 2007 Edgars Zalāns became the Minister of Regional Development, a post he held until 2010.

References

External links
Government profile

1967 births
Living people
People from Kuldīga
People's Party (Latvia) politicians
Ministers of Regional Development and Local Governments of Latvia
Deputies of the 7th Saeima
Deputies of the 10th Saeima
Latvian architects
Riga Technical University alumni